Pedicularia elegantissima is a species of sea snail, a marine gastropod mollusk in the family Ovulidae, one of the families of cowry allies.

Distribution
This marine species occurs off Réunion.

References

 Liltved W.R. (2000) Cowries and their relatives of southern Africa. A study of the southern African cypraeacean and velutinacean gastropod fauna. Seacomber Publications. 224 pp.
 Lorenz F. & Fehse D. (2009) The living Ovulidae. A manual of the families of allied cowries: Ovulidae, Pediculariidae and Eocypraeidae. Hackenheim: Conchbooks.

External links
 Deshayes, G. P. (1863). Catalogue des mollusques de l'île de la Réunion (Bourbon). Pp. 1–144. In Maillard, L. (Ed.) Notes sur l'Ile de la Réunion. Dentu, Paris.

Pediculariinae
Gastropods described in 1863